Yarn weight refers to the thickness of yarn used by knitters, weavers, crocheters and other fiber artists.

Importance
Changing yarn weight or needle size can have a significant impact on the finished project, so standardized systems have been spread about, as well as conversion systems for regional standards (especially needle sizes).

Yarn weight is important in achieving the correct gauge or tension for a particular project and can help with yarn substitution. The Craft Yarn Council of America has developed a system that seeks to standardize the labeled weights of yarn. Most yarns state their weight on the ball band but some may not, only giving the composition. Some brands use a standardized numbering system that uses seven ranges of relative thickness of yarn. However there are methods for individuals to gauge weight for themselves.

Wrap method
A way of determining the weight of an unknown yarn is to use the wrapping method. This method is also used to calculate the amount of yarn needed for a project. By this method it is possible to check an unknown weight of yarn with a regular pencil and ruler without unwinding the yarn. Simply slip the pencil under approximately an inch of the strands and count the number of strands.

Wrap the yarn around a large needle or a ruler. Make sure the yarn lies flat. Push the yarn together so there are no gaps between wraps. Smooth it out so it is neither too loose nor too tight. Measure the number of wraps per inch (2.5 cm). For better accuracy, measure the wraps at the center of your yarn sample.

The number of wraps will act as a gauge to assess the thickness of unmarked yarn; for example 12 wraps per inch is 12 WPI, and is used to calculate how much yarn is required for various articles, so that 12 is equivalent to 8 ply (worsted weight, medium weight) yarn.

Swatch methods
A more hands-on method, there is the test swatch and the gauge swatch. Knitting a test swatch requires knitting the yarn into a small, roughly 4 in (10 cm) square textile of even stitches. Comparing this with recommended needle sizes, yarn, and the knitter's own signature tension, allows for adjustments to all of these things. For example, changing needle size is one way to bring the test swatch nearer to an accurate measurement in yarn weight.

The gauge swatch goes further. Not only is it a tool for checking whether yarn conforms to a desired dimension, but it is usually produced with some of the complexities of the intended project (i.e. multiple colors, varied stitches, edgings) making it a much larger test piece. This larger sample is then "dressed" meaning washed, ironed, and subjected to other processes expected of the finished item. It is especially used for items that require a lot of work and time, to avoid dimensional mistakes in the long run.

International standard weights
Below is a table comparing yarn weights in a range of places

Fabric 

Equations may be used to determine the weight of warp and weft required for a particular fabric:

Weight of warp = (0.65 x qty. of fabric (metres) x no. of warp ends) / count

If there are two colors in the warp, use the following equations:

Weight of color A (kg) = (0.65 x qty. of fabric (metres) x no. of warp ends of color A) / count of color A
Weight of color B (kg) = (0.65 x Qty. of fabric (metres) x no. of warp ends of color B) / count of color B

If the counts of two warps are the same:

Weight of color A (kg) = (total weight of warp reqd. x no. of ends of color A) / total no. of warp ends
Weight of color B (kg) = (total weight of warp reqd. x no. of ends of color B) / total no. of warp ends

or

Weight of color (B) = total weight of warp reqd. - weight of color A
Weight of weft = (0.6 x qty. of fabric (metres) x PPI x reed space) / count

If there are two colors in the weft:

Weight of color A (kg) = (0.6 x qty. of fabric (metres) x PPI of color A x reed space) / count of color A
Weight of color B (kg) = (0.6 x qty. of fabric (metres) x PPI of color B x reed space) / count of color B

or

Weight of color (B) = total weight of weft reqd. - weight of color A
 Another formula

 Reed x width / 7000 = Ans

See also
Yarn
List of yarns for crochet and knitting

References

Textile arts
Knitting
Crochet
Weaving
Yarn